Kim Jong-min (born 15 June 1980) is a South Korean field hockey player. He competed in the men's tournament at the 2004 Summer Olympics.

References

External links
 

1980 births
Living people
South Korean male field hockey players
Olympic field hockey players of South Korea
Field hockey players at the 2004 Summer Olympics
Place of birth missing (living people)